Kathy Jordan was the defending champion but lost in the second round to Billie Jean King.

Wendy Turnbull won in the final 6–4, 3–6, 6–4 against Sylvia Hanika.

Seeds
A champion seed is indicated in bold text while text in italics indicates the round in which that seed was eliminated.

 n/a
  Tracy Austin (semifinals)
  Wendy Turnbull (champion)
  Sylvia Hanika (final)
  Billie Jean King (semifinals)
  Barbara Potter (quarterfinals)
 n/a
  Rosalyn Fairbank (first round)

Draw

External links
 ITF tournament draws
 WTA tournament draws

Virginia Slims of Boston
1983 Virginia Slims World Championship Series
Virginia
Virginia